The following is a list of notable deaths in November 1989.

Entries for each day are listed alphabetically by surname. A typical entry lists information in the following sequence:
 Name, age, country of citizenship at birth, subsequent country of citizenship (if applicable), reason for notability, cause of death (if known), and reference.

November 1989

1
Louis Barron, 69, American electronic musician.
Norman Billing, 76, Australian politician.
Peter Childs, 50, English actor, leukemia.
Hoimar von Ditfurth, 68, German scientific journalist, thyroid cancer.
Haranath, 53, Indian actor, alcohol poisoning.
Elise Harney, 65, American baseball player.
Sadie Tanner Mossell Alexander, 91, American civil rights activist, first African-American to receive a PhD in economics, complications from Alzheimer's disease.
Mihaela Runceanu, 34, Romanian singer, strangled.
Dagmar Sandvig, 68, Norwegian politician.
Max Streib, 76, Swiss Olympic handball player (1936).

2
Inés Arredondo, 61, Mexican writer.
Truus Bauer, 44, Dutch rower.
Reidar Bruu, 86, Norwegian politician.
John Clymer, 82, American painter.
Morris H. DeGroot, 58, American statistician.
Cecilia Fatou-Berre, 88, Congolese-Gabonese religious sister.
Elizabeth Hawley Gasque, 103, American politician, member of the U.S. House of Representatives (1938–1939).
Frederick Gordon-Lennox, 9th Duke of Richmond, 85, British hereditary peer.
Henry M. Margolis, 80, American industrialist and theatre producer.
Tom Mennard, 71, English comedian and actor, cancer.
Steve Simpson, 41, American baseball player, heart attack.
R. Sankara Narayanan Thampi, 78, Indian politician.
Shana Yardan, 46, Guyanese poet, cancer.

3
Timoci Bavadra, 55, Fijian politician, prime minister (1987), cancer.
Louis Craine, 32, American serial killer, AIDS.
Ruth Frankel, 85–86, American-Canadian physician.
Dorothy Fuldheim, 96, American journalist.
Ture Isberg, 89, Swedish footballer.
Ed Kasid, 66, American basketball player.
William Morris Jr., 90, American talent agent.
Zelma O'Neal, 86, American actress.
Edward J. Stack, 79, American politician, member of the U.S. House of Representatives (1979–1981).
Mikhail Tsiselsky, 80, Soviet naval pilot.

4
Pancho Coimbre, 80, Puerto Rican baseball player, house fire.
Theodore G. Garfield, 94, American judge.
Trevor Kent, 49, Australian actor, AIDS.
Erkki Kerttula, 79, Finnish Olympic fencer (1948, 1952).
Clare Leighton, 91, English-American artist.
Edwin Pemberton, 81, Australian footballer.
Howard A. Rusk, 88, American physician.
John Taylor, 81, Canadian Olympic skier (1932).
Bohumil Váňa, 69, Czechoslovak table tennis player.

5
Adem Čejvan, 62, Yugoslav actor.
Ted Cox, 86, American football player and coach.
Johs Elvestad, 90, Norwegian composer.
Vladimir Horowitz, 86, Russian-born American pianist and composer, heart attack.
A. G. Lancione, 82, American politician.
John O'Connell, 38, Australian footballer.
Howard Reppert, 71, American politician, cancer.
Barry Sadler, 49, American soldier, author, and singer ("The Ballad of the Green Berets"), cardiac arrest 
Tsutsumi Sakamoto, 33, Japanese lawyer, murdered.
Margot Seitelman, 61, German-born American businesswoman, cancer.
Lu Watters, 77, American trumpeter.
Benigno Zaccagnini, 77, Italian politician.

6
Irene Baker, 70–71, American pollination biologist.
Margarete Buber-Neumann, 88, German writer.
Adrian Dullard, 71, Australian footballer.
Dickie Goodman, 55, American record producer, suicide by gunshot.
Tina Isa, 16, American murder victim, honor killing.
Alex Jordan Jr., 75, American architect.
Margit Makay, 98, Hungarian actress.
Yūsaku Matsuda, 40, Japanese actor, bladder cancer.
Bjarne Rosén, 80, Norwegian footballer.

7
Paula Acker, 76, German journalist.
Dai Astley, 80, Welsh footballer.
Andrey Borovykh, 68, Soviet flying ace, stroke.
Jack Hanson, Australian footballer.
May Justus, 91, American author.
Gilbert Lesage, 79, French humanitarian and philanthropist.
Alec Mango, 78, English actor.
Milton K. Ozaki, 76, American writer.
Brunello Rondi, 64, Italian filmmaker, heart attack.
Jan Skácel, 67, Czechoslovak poet.
J. Curry Street, 83, American physicist.
Tommy Tatum, 70, American baseball player.
Dick Vorisek, 71, American sound engineer.
Keith Walker, 66, English cricketer.

8
Chen Jingrong, 72, Chinese poet.
Choi Ja-shil, 74, South Korean pastor.
Gordon Cunningham, 55, Scottish golfer.
Robert Gerringer, 63, American actor, stroke.
Ray D. Hahn, 91, American football player and coach.
Johnny Lanning, 79, American baseball player.
Lee Yuk-wing, 85, Chinese-American electrical engineer.
Gertrude Leverkus, 91, German-British architect.
Yitzhak Raveh, 82, German-Israeli judge.
Maud Russell, 96, American social worker and writer, lung cancer.
Gino Soldà, 82, Italian Olympic skier (1932).
Lionel Wigmore, 90, Australian journalist and historian.
Elmer Wynne, 88, American football player.
Howard Yates, 75, Australian runner.
Mary Agnes Yerkes, 103, American artist.

9
Doug Anderson, 75, Scottish footballer.
Herbert Arlene, 75, American politician.
Cliff Ashburn, 83, American football player.
Kenny Hagood, 63, American jazz musician.
Arthur John Holland, 71, American politician, cancer.
Enriqueta Mayora, 68, Mexican Olympic fencer (1948).
Bob McLean, 75, Australian footballer.
Les Meade, 85, Australian footballer.
Bill Neilson, 64, Australian politician, cancer.
Roar Pedersen, 61, Norwegian ice hockey player.
Nenad Petrović, 82, Yugoslav chess player.
Sarwo Edhie Wibowo, 64, Indonesian general, fever.
Leen Vente, 78, Dutch footballer.

10
Peter Berglar, 70, German historian.
Syd Dineen, 75, Australian footballer.
Cookie Mueller, 40, American actress, AIDS.
Niels Schibbye, 79, Danish Olympic sailor (1936).
Craig J. Spence, 49, American journalist and lobbyist, suicide by drug overdose.

11
Casey Anderson, 55, American musician, complications from surgery.
Robert Boyer, 80, American chemist.
Jay DeFeo, 60, American artist, lung cancer.
Mohamed Demsiri, 52–53, Moroccan musician.
Alberto Guzmán Soriano, 66, Bolivian politician.
Fritz Hartmann, 78, Swiss racing cyclist.
Natalio Pescia, 67, Argentine footballer.
Francesco Stefani, 66, German film director.
Tadeusz Żbikowski, 59, Polish Sinologist.

12
Shaher Abu Shahout, 63, Jordanian military officer.
Édouard Candeveau, 91, Swiss rower.
Brendan Holland, 70–71, Irish politician.
Iolas Huffman, 91, American football and baseball player.
Dolores Ibárruri, 93, Spanish politician.
Sir Donald Liddle, 83, Scottish corporate director.
Mao Yisheng, 93, Chinese engineer, academic administrator, and politician.
Armour G. McDaniel, 73, American military officer.
Victor Putmans, 75, Belgian footballer.
Čeněk Zahradníček, 89, Czechoslovak filmmaker.

13
Eurico Caires, 37, Portuguese footballer.
Stewart Chalmers, 82, Scottish footballer.
C. Fred Chambers, 71, American oilman and political aide.
Victor Davis, 25, Canadian Olympic swimmer (1984, 1988), traffic collision.
Franz Joseph II, 83, Liechtensteiner royal, prince (since 1938).
Upatissa Gamanayake, 41, Sri Lankan militant, shot.
Roger Heman Jr, 57, American sound engineer, lung cancer.
H. B. Herath, 35, Sri Lankan political activist, shot.
Deolus W. Husband, 30, American composer, AIDS.
Arthur Hutchings, 83, English musicologist.
Oliver F. Naquin, 85, American naval admiral, pancreatic cancer.
Samuel Singer, 69, Scottish clergyman.
Rohana Wijeweera, 46, Sri Lankan militant, shot.
Gennady Yudin, 66, Soviet actor.

14
Choe Deok-sin, 75, Korean diplomat and South Korean defector.
Bill Davison, 83, American jazz musician.
Wilhelm Keilmann, 81, German pianist and composer, heart failure.
Rémi Laurent, 32, French actor, AIDS.
Jimmy Murphy, 79, Welsh footballer, aortic dissection.
Teo Savory, 81, American writer, lung cancer.
Samand Siabandov, 79, Soviet writer and soldier.
John Howard Starr, 90–91, American ice hockey coach.

15
George Barco, 82, American cable television executive.
Constance Binney, 93, American actress and dancer.
Robert B. Brandeberry, 75, American philatelist.
William N. Deramus III, 73, American railroad executive.
Alejo Durán, 70, Colombian musician.
Rocky Ellis, 78, American baseball player.
Jeremy Flint, 61, English bridge player, cancer.
Lipót Kállai, 76, Hungarian Olympic footballer (1936).
George Manuel, 68, Canadian indigenous leader.
Homer Marshman, 91, American sports executive.
Nguyễn Khang, 77, Vietnamese painter.
Piyadasa Ranasinghe, 43, Sri Lankan political activist, shot.
Andrzej Gąsienica Roj, 58, Polish Olympic skier (1952, 1956).
Norma Terris, 85, American actress.
Gunaratne Wanasinghe, 40, Sri Lankan political activist, shot.

16
Petar Argirov, 66, Bulgarian Olympic footballer (1952).
Nathan Cohn, 82, American electrical engineer.
Rachel Harel, 66, Dutch-Israeli resistance fighter.
Jean-Claude Malépart, 50, Canadian politician.
Rose Murphy, 76, American jazz singer.
Dorothy G. Page, 68, American politician.
Oliver Smedley, 78, English businessman and political activist.
Marie Uchytilová, 65, Czechoslovak sculptor.
Victims of the 1989 murders of Jesuits in El Salvador:
Ignacio Ellacuría, 59, Spanish-Salvadoran Jesuit, philosopher, and theologian, shot.
Ignacio Martín-Baró, 47, Spanish-Salvadoran Jesuit, philosopher, and theologian, shot.
Segundo Montes, 56, Spanish-Salvadoran Jesuit, philosopher, and theologian, shot.

17
David Blundy, 44, British journalist, shot.
Jacob Børretzen, 89, Norwegian hymnwriter and linguist.
Emerson Buckley, 73, American orchestra conductor, emphysema.
Francis John Dunn, 67, American Roman Catholic prelate.
Costabile Farace, 29, American mobster (Bonanno crime family), shot.
Benjamin Fisz, 66–67, Polish film director.
Anton Fransch, 19–20, South African anti-Apartheid activist, shot.
Uzair Gul Peshawari, 102–103, Indian Islamic scholar.
Joseph Hiley, 87, British politician.
Johannes Krass, 98, Soviet Estonian politician.
Billy Lee, 60, American actor, heart attack.
Thiruchi Loganathan, 65, Indian singer.
Ern Pedler, 75, Australian-born American writer.
Luis Santaliz Capestany, 75, Puerto Rican politician.
Charles Perry Stacey, 83, Canadian historian.
Tom Starcevich, 71, Australian soldier.
Sam Voinoff, 82, American sports coach.

18
Romano Bilenchi, 80, Italian author.
Hendrik de Vries, 93, Dutch poet and painter.
Les Deaton, 66, American basketball player, stroke.
Norman Frauenheim, 92, American pianist.
William Wister Haines, 81, American author and playwright.
Johnny Haymer, 69, American actor, cancer.
Edvin Laine, 84, Finnish film director.
Al Morgan, 74, American singer and composer.
Sherman Plunkett, 56, American football player, cancer.
Freddie Waits, 46, American drummer, pneumonia and kidney failure.

19
Grant Adcox, 39, American racing driver, racing crash.
Jim Bradfield, 56, Australian politician.
Clemente Carreras, 75, Cuban-Mexican baseball player and manager.
Nancy Drexel, 79, American actress.
Sol Harrison, 71–72, American comic book executive.
Shigeki Mori, 79, Japanese politician.
Harold V. Schoenecker, 86, American politician.

20
Annihilate 'Em, 19, American Thoroughbred racehorse.
Lynn Bari, 69, American actress, heart attack.
Arnold Bauman, 75, American judge.
Cyril Bulley, 82, English Anglican prelate.
Wade Ellis, 80, American mathematician.
Sighsten Herrgård, 46, Finnish-born Swedish fashon designer, AIDS.
Božidar Jakac, 90, Yugoslav artist.
Zola Helen Ross, 77, American writer.
Leonardo Sciascia, 68, Italian screenwriter and politician, MEP (1979–1984).
Abe Stuber, 86, American football player.
William J. Whaling, 95, American general.
Rachel Wischnitzer, 104, Russian-born German art historian.

21
Edward Bawden, 86, English artist.
Edward Bayliss, 71, English cricketer.
Peter Burton, 68, English actor.
Helen Daniels Bader, 62, American philanthropist and social worker.
Will Glahé, 87, German musician.
Arne Grahn, 87, Finnish Olympic tennis player (1924).
Harvey Hart, 61, Canadian film director and television producer, heart attack.
Tibor Székelyhidy, 85, Hungarian Olympic fencer (1936).
Yana, 58, British singer, esophageal cancer.

22
Paul Alfonsi, 81, American politician.
Roberto Arias, 71, Panamanian politician and diplomat.
C. C. Beck, 79, American comic book artist, co-creator of Captain Marvel, renal failure.
Robert Berri, 76, French actor.
Helen Lehman Buttenwieser, 84, American lawyer, heart failure.
Gerry Chiniquy, 77, American animator.
José Guadalupe Cruz, 72, Mexican writer.
H. O. Davies, 84, Nigerian politician.
Paul Dressel, 78, American psychologist.
Clement Haynsworth, 77, American judge.
Billy Milton, 83, British actor.
René Moawad, 64, Lebanese politician, president (since 1989), assassination by car bomb.
Vijay Rajindernath, 61, Indian cricketer.
Shamil Serikov, 33, Soviet Olympic wrestler (1980), suicide.
Dorothy Louise Thomas, 84, British nurse.

23
Jiří Baumruk, 59, Czechoslovak basketball player and coach.
Martin Glaessner, 82, Austrian-Australian geologist.
Francis Appleton Harding, 81, American politician.
Sidney Janis, 93, American art collector.
Rita Lenihan, 75, American naval officer.
Lefty Moses, 75, American baseball player.
Armand Salacrou, 90, French dramatist.
Mariko Shiga, 19, Japanese singer, traffic collision.
Else Werring, 84, Norwegian royal hostess.

24
E. Ruth Anderson, 82, American musicologist and meteorologist.
Abdullah Yusuf Azzam, 48, Palestinian Salafi jihadist, scholar, and theologian, co-founder of the Maktab al-Khidamat, assassination by car bomb.
Gordon Bess, 60, American cartoonist.
Leonard Boudin, 77, American lawyer.
Michael Harwood, 54–55, American environmentalist.
Lawrence A. Hyland, 92, American electrical engineer.
Richard Korherr, 86, German statistician.
Ralph Norwood, 23, American football player, traffic collision.
Toni Zweifel, 51, Swiss engineer.

25
Salo Wittmayer Baron, 94, Polish-born American historian.
Sir George Cakobau, 77, Fijian politician, governor-general (1973–1983).
Harry Challis, 83, Australian footballer.
Claus Clausen, 90, German actor.
Birago Diop, 82, Senegalese poet.
Alva R. Fitch, 82, American general.
John Kaplan, 59–60, American legal scholar, brain cancer.
Bill Neskovski, 25, Yugoslav-born Australian playwright.
Kōhine Pōnika, 69, New Zealand composer.
George Smith, 83, English cricketer.
Mary Smith, 80, English-born Australian psychologist.
Frank A. Southard Jr., 82, American economist and banker.
Sir William Stratton, 86, British army officer.
Frank M. Thomas, 100, American actor.
Clifford Thornton, 53, American jazz musician.

26
Ahmed Abdallah, 70, Comorian politician, president (1975, since 1978), shot.
William Barber, 70, English cricketer.
Joe C. Davis Jr., 70, American businessman, Hodgkin lymphoma.
Caroline Durieux, 93, American artist.
Lew Fonseca, 90, American baseball player.
Morrice James, Baron Saint Brides, 73, British diplomat.
Maurice Kelly, 65, Bahamian Olympic sailor (1960).
Priscilla Robertson, 78–79, American historian, stroke.
Thomas Seens, 94, Canadian politician.
Chand Usmani, 56, Indian actress.

27
Carlos Arias Navarro, 80, Spanish politician, prime minister (1973–1976), infarction.
Eddie Balchowsky, 73, American poet and composer.
Ray Boggs, 84, American baseball player.
Tomás Garbizu, 88, Spanish composer.
Gunnar Hedlund, 89, Swedish politician.
Walter Hoving, 91, Swedish-born American businessman.
Eliana Martínez, 18, American medical malpractice victim, AIDS.
Øystein Mellerud, 51, Norwegian ice hockey player.
Trude von Molo, 82, Austrian actress.
Norma Nichols, 95, American actress.
Fritz Poleck, 84, German army officer.
Osamu Shimomura, 78–79, Japanese economist.
K. A. Subramaniam, 58, Sri Lankan politician.
Claudio Teehankee, 71, Filipino judge and diplomat.

28
Beethoven Algar, 95, New Zealand rugby player.
Arsenie Boca, 79, Romanian theologian.
Stan Cawtheray, 83, New Zealand footballer.
Ernesto Civardi, 83, Italian cardinal and secretary of the Dicastery for Bishops.
Georgy Ilivitsky, 68, Soviet chess player.
Gaston F. Lewis, 86, American baseball player.
Dolan Nichols, 59, American baseball player.
Ion Popescu-Gopo, 66, Romanian animator.
Bill Posedel, 83, American baseball player.
Jo Vincent, 91, Dutch singer.
Duke Wells, 75, American sports coach.

29
Andreas Alariesto, 88, Finnish painter.
Sir Gubby Allen, 87, Australian-born English cricketer, complications from stomach surgery.
Giuseppe Antonini, 75, Italian footballer.
Nancy Bell, 65, Canadian politician.
Chandler McCuskey Brooks, 83, American physiologist.
Marion E. Burks, 77, American politician.
Ann Burton, 56, Dutch jazz singer, throat cancer.
Mario Colli, 74, Italian actor.
Zuko Džumhur, 69, Yugoslav writer.
Jeanne Herviale, 80, French actress.
Jim Jepson, 47, Canadian politician, heart failure.
Valentina Kameníková, 58, Czechoslovak pianist.
A. Maruthakasi, 69, Indian lyricist and poet.
Francis J. McCaffrey, 72, American politician, stroke.
Frank J. Scannell, 86, American actor.
Rolf Turkka, 74, Finnish Olympic sailor (1948, 1952).
Yam Kim-fai, 76, Chinese actress, pleural effusion.

30
Ahmadou Ahidjo, 65, Cameroonian politician, prime minister (1960) and president (1960–1982), heart attack.
Stjepan Boltižar, 76, Yugoslav Olympic gymnast (1948).
Hassan Fathy, 89, Egyptian architect.
Wiremu Heke, 95, New Zealand rugby player.
Alfred Herrhausen, 59, German banker, bombing.
Teddy Jones, 79, Australian footballer.
Charles Lamarque-Cando, 88, French politician.
Artur Lind, 62, Soviet molecular biologist.
Edward Lisbona, 84, English musician.
Birger Nordholm, 92, Swedish-American travel director.
Pier Luigi Vestrini, 84, Italian Olympic rower (1928).

References 

1989-11
 11